The Backstrom EPB-1 Flying Plank is an American mid-wing, single seat, tailless glider that was designed by Al Backstrom, with assistance from Phil Easley and Jack Powell in 1954 and made available as plans for amateur construction.

Design and development
The Flying Plank was intended to be an aircraft that could be built at home, that would be of minimum size and yet still provide reasonable soaring performance. The prototype Plank featured tip rudders and was used for drag-reduction tests conducted at Mississippi State University before it was retired. The EPB-1 designation indicates the design team's last names.

The EPB-1 is constructed with a wooden structure, with doped aircraft fabric covering. The landing gear is a monowheel, with a nose skid.

The "A" model was described in the plans sold and retained the twin tip rudders of the EPB-1, although some were built with a single fin and rudder assembly attached to the cockpit rear. At least one two-place side-by-side seating version was built in Australia, and another as a motor glider.

Operational history
In March 2011 two EPB-1s were still registered in the USA, including the one in the National Soaring Museum.

Variants

EPB-1
Initial prototype with dual tip rudders
EPB-1A
Standard model built from plans, also with dual tip rudders
EPB-1C
Model modified by Al Cleave, featuring a centrally-mounted fin and rudder.
EPB-1H
Model modified with a different airfoil, was not successful, dismantled.
Flying Plank II
Motor glider version

Aircraft on display
National Soaring Museum - EPB-1A and EPB-1C

Specifications (EPB-1A)

See also

References

External links
Photo of EPB-1C

1950s United States sailplanes
Tailless aircraft
Homebuilt aircraft
Aircraft first flown in 1954